Michael Bruter is Professor of political science and European politics at the London School of Economics, where he directs the Electoral Psychology Observatory in collaboration with Sarah Harrison. He is also a co-founder of CODES Collaborative Democracy Solutions with Sarah Harrison, a venture also supported by the LSE which uses research findings from electoral psychology, electoral ergonomics, technology, and design to create new democratic tools. A discoverer of the sub-fields of electoral psychology and electoral ergonomics, Bruter is also a specialist in political behaviour, political psychology, elections, public opinion, research methods, comparative politics, political participation, political communication, youth politics, extremism, protest politics, and European politics.

Biography

Bruter earned an undergraduate degree from the Bordeaux Institute of Political Studies in 1996, a master's degree in European Studies from the University of Hull in 1997 and a master's degree in European Political and Economic History from the University of Bordeaux in 1998. He obtained his PhD in 2001 from the University of Houston, and lectured at the University of Hull from 1999 to 2001, before joining the London School of Economics and Political Science in 2001. He was promoted to professor in 2014, and also serves as Director-founder of the Electoral Psychology Observatory since February 2020.

He is an associate member of the Centre for the Study of Democratic Citizenship at McGill University in Montreal, as well as Europa Fellow at the Australian National University. He has also held numerous visiting appointments, notably at Columbia University (New York), the University of Melbourne, the Bordeaux and Strasbourg Instituts d'Etudes Politiques, the University of Canterbury, the University of Salzburg, etc.

Research

European identity 
Bruter's doctoral thesis, published in 2001 as "Understanding identity realignments: The emergence of a mass European identity", was partly funded by a grant from the Economic and Social Research Council (ESRC). One of his supervisors was Professor Mark Franklin, a lead expert on electoral and European Union politics.

In 2005, he published "Citizens of Europe?: The Emergence of a Mass European Identity".

Extreme-right in Europe 

In "Mapping Extreme Right Ideology" (2011), Michael Bruter and Sarah Harrison investigate 25 extreme-right parties in 17 European countries. Their multimethod research (mass survey, leaders interviews, textual analysis) results in a new model of European extreme-right politics, based on expressions of authoritairan values and negative identity. 

Their research also recognises the diversity of the extreme-right party family.

Inside the Mind of a Voter: A New Approach to Electoral Psychology – Electoral Psychology and Electoral Ergonomics 
In 2013, Bruter's ECREP at LSE team won the award for Best International Research from the Market Research Society alongside Opinium Research for Bruter's "Inside the Mind of a Voter" project (which survey fieldwork was completed by Opinium). The €1.2 million project on electoral psychology is funded by the European Research Council. Beyond academic publications, the project has had an important public profile, with a presentation at the Falling Walls conference, an interview in Nature, and multiple references in the media, for example in the Guardian, Le Monde, etc.

In 2020, Bruter and Harrison published "Inside the mind of a voter: a new approach to electoral psychology", offering a new political psychology perspective to electoral politics, by focussing on the point of view and emotions of voters, rather than on electoral instituions. 

This research is not only about studying voters' emotions, but seeks to determine how to improve electoral institutions by better taking into account these emotions. This has led Bruter to collaborate with several Electoral Commissions (Australia, Georgia, Sweden, Palestinian Territories, South Africa, etc.), European Union institutions, and several international or cultural organizations, such as the British Council. As explained by Bruter and Harrison (2017: "Understanding the emotional act of voting"):

Electoral hostility 
On 6 April 2018, the European Research Council (ERC) announced that Bruter had been awarded an Advanced Grant of €2.5 million over five years for his new project ELHO dedicated to the study of electoral hostility in 27 democracies. Bruter explained that the project is intended to understand why so many people hate each other because of the way they vote, what are the implications of this hostility and what can be done to resolve it.

Bruter and his EPO colleagues have developed a "Hostitlity Barometer". For example, during the 2019 UK General Elections, the research team found that "49% of those intending to vote Conservative feel some “contempt” towards Labour voters, and 68% of those intending to vote Labour feel some “disgust” towards Conservative voters".

This "The Age of Hostility" project is one of the two founding projets of the Electoral Psychology Observatory (Department of Government, LSE), alongside the "First and Foremost" projet (analysing the experience of first-time voters).

First time voters and youth democratic experience 

In 2011, Buter received a €250,000 European Commission grant to study youth participation in Europe, having done previous research on young party members' motivations in European democracies. In 2016, he published "Youth participation in Europe: In between hope and disillusion" (with Cammaerts, Banaji, Harrison, and Anstead). 

In 2016, Bruter started a new project on optimising the electoral experience of first time voter in collaboration with Sarah Harrison and a number of leading Electoral Commissions around the world, resulting in the EPO's "First and Foremost" projet, funded by a £720,000 grant from the Economic and Social Research Council. One of the key justification of this research is the fact that youth who abstain in the first two elections of their lives are likely to become chronic abstentionnist, while those who vote in their first two elections can be expected to be regiular participants. Therefore, improving first-time voters' experience is key to maintaining a reasonably high electoral turnout.

Bruter spoke in favor of lowering the legal voting age because young people who still live with their parents are more likely to vote, which could lead to a higher turnout among first-time voters, and thus also to higher participation in the long term due to the habituation phenomenon associated with youths' first two votes.

In November 2022, the Economic and Social Research Council (ESRC) annonced that Bruter and Harrison had been awarded the Celebrating Impact Pize 2022 for Outstanding international impact due to the EPO's work on optimising citizens’ electoral experience.

Empowering citizens with technology 
Bruter and Sarah Harrison also founded the Collaborative Democracy Solutions (CODES) project, supported by the LSE, which aims to better undertand the mind of voters, as well as optimise electoral and consultative processes, using technology. On of the project's key acievment is the Code T human-led articifial intelligence, which allows citizens to express their preferences in their own words and have them translated into "powerful, accurate, and transaprent collective decisions".

In 2022, the project received a European Research Council Proof of Concept grant of €150,000.

Awards 
 Winner ESRC/UKRI Celebrating Impact Prize for     Outstanding International Impact (2022)
 Stein Rokkan award for Best International Research, Honourable mention, for Inside the Mind of a Voter (2021)
 Best International Research Award, Market Research     Society for “Inside the Mind of a Voter” (2013)
 Best International Research Award, Special mention, Market Research Society for “Values in international cooperation” (2021) 
 Best International Research Award, Finalist,     Market Research Society for “Feeling European” (2014)

Selected publications
Inside the Mind of a Voter. Princeton University Press, 2020.  (with Sarah Harrison). This book received the Honourable Mention for the Stein Rokkan prize 2021 jointly awarded by the European Consortium for Political Research and the International Science Council for best book in comparative social science.
Youth Participation in Democratic Life.  Palgrave Macmillan, 2016. (with Bart Cammaerts, Shaku Banaji, Sarah Harrison, and Nick Anstead)]
Political science research methods in action. Palgrave Macmillan, Basingstoke, 2013. (With Martin Lodge) 
 Asia in the Eyes of Europe: Images of a Rising Giant. Nomos, 2012. (Co-edited with Sebastian Bersick, Natalia Chaban, Sol Iglesias, and Ronan Lenihan)
Mapping Extreme Right Ideology. Palgrave Macmillan, 2011 (with Sarah Harrison).
The Future of our Democracies. Palgrave Macmillan, 2009. (With Sarah Harrison)
Encyclopaedia of European elections. Palgrave Macmillan, Basington, 2007.  (With Yves Deloye)
Citizens of Europe? The emergence of a mass European identity. Palgrave Macmillan, 2005.

References

External links
http://www.epob.org
https://twitter.com/EPO_lse
Michael Bruter speaking at the Falling Walls conference in Berlin
Michael Bruter talking on European Identity: Quantitative Research Methods

Academics of the London School of Economics
Living people
Year of birth missing (living people)
Academics of the University of Hull
University of Houston faculty
Alumni of the University of Hull
University of Bordeaux alumni
University of Houston alumni
Academic staff of the Australian National University
Psephologists
American political scientists